Paton may refer to:


People
 Paton (surname)
 Paton James Gloag (1823–1906), Scottish minister and theological author
 Gonzalo Basile (born 1974), Argentine boxer nicknamed "El Paton"

Places
 Hundred of Paton, one of the Hundreds in Palmerston County, Australia
 Paton, Iowa, United States, a city in Greene County
 Paton Township, Greene County, Iowa, a township
 Paton Peak, Beaufort Island, Ross Archipelago, Antarctica
 2727 Paton, an asteroid

Other uses
 Paton Bridge across the Dnieper in Kiev, Ukraine
 Paton College, residences operated by Memorial University of Newfoundland, St. John's, Newfoundland and Labrador, Canada
 Paton Field, a rugby union statium in Thurstaston, Wirral Peninsula, England
 Paton (motorcycles), Italian motorcycle manufacturer

See also
 Batu Paton, a settlement in Sarawak, Malaysia
 Patons and Baldwins, leading British manufacturer of knitting yarn
 Payton (disambiguation)
 Peyton (disambiguation)
 Paitone